Potez (pronounced ) was a French aircraft manufacturer founded as Aéroplanes Henry Potez by Henry Potez at Aubervilliers in 1919. The firm began by refurbishing war-surplus SEA IV aircraft, but was soon building new examples of an improved version, the Potez SEA VII.

History
During the inter-war years, Potez built a range of small passenger aircraft and a series of military reconnaissance biplanes that were also licence-built in Poland. In 1933, the firm bought flying boat manufacturer CAMS.

The company was nationalized in 1936, following which it was merged with Chantiers aéronavals Étienne Romano, Lioré et Olivier, CAMS and SPCA in order to form the Société nationale des constructions aéronautiques du Sud-Est (SNCASE) on 1 February 1937.

Potez's factories in Sartrouville and Méaulte were taken over by SNCAN and the Berre factory went to SNCASE.

After World War II, Potez was re-established as Société des Avions et Moteurs Henry Potez at Argenteuil but did not return to the prominence that the company enjoyed prior to nationalisation. In 1958, the company bought Fouga to form Potez Air-Fouga, but when Potez's last design, the 840 (a small turboprop airliner) failed to attract customers, it was forced to close. The remaining assets were purchased by Sud-Aviation in 1967.

Aircraft

 Potez VII
 Potez VIII
 Potez IX
 Potez X
 Potez XI
 Potez XV
 Potez XVII
 Potez 23
 Potez 25
 Potez 27
 Potez 28
 Potez 29
 Potez 31
 Potez 32 
 Potez 33 
 Potez 36 
 Potez 37 
 Potez 38
 Potez 39 
 Potez 42
 Potez 43
 Potez 50 
 Potez 53 
 Potez 54 
 Potez 56 
 Potez 58 
 Potez 60 
 Potez 62 
 Potez 63 
 Potez 65 
 Potez 75 
 Potez 91 
 Potez 220
 Potez 230
 Potez 452
 Potez 540
 Potez 630
 Potez 650
 Potez 661
 Potez 662
 Potez 840
 Potez-CAMS 140 project only
 Potez-CAMS 141
 Potez-CAMS 142 project only
 Potez-CAMS 160
 Potez-CAMS 161
 Potez SEA VII

Engines
 Potez A-4 (1920s)
 Potez 4D
 Potez 4E
 Potez 6D
 Potez 8D
 Potez 12D
 Potez 9A
 Potez 9B (9 cylinder radial)

See also

List of aircraft manufacturers
List of aircraft engine manufacturers

References

External links

Defunct aircraft manufacturers of France
Defunct aircraft engine manufacturers of France